Ignacio "Nacho" Calero Pérez (born 5 July 1991) is a Spanish motorcycle racer. He currently races in the Supersport World Championship aboard a Kawasaki ZX-6R.

Career

European Superstock 600 Championship

In 2008 Calero made his debut in the European Superstock 600 Championship. He endured a difficult rookie season as he only scored 3 points in ten races. In 2009 Calero improved as he finished 18th in the standings scoring 17 points. 2010 proved to be a breakthrough season for Calero as he finished 9th in the Championship with 59 points. He also scored his first career podium when he finished third at Misano. Calero fell back in 2011 as he finished 15th in the standings with a best finish of sixth at Assen. He did however set the fastest race lap at Monza, the first time he did so in his career. Calero made a strong start to the 2012 season with 2 second places at Imola and Assen. At that point he was second in the Championship, but after not scoring a podium for the rest of the season Calero fell back to 9th in the Championship.

Supersport World Championship

In 2013 Calero stepped up to the Supersport World Championship riding a Honda CBR600RR for the Honda PTR team. It was a real hard season for Calero and he did not score any points that season. Calero remained with the team for the 2014 season. He kept struggling but he did score his first points with a 13th-place finish at Phillip Island. He moved to the Orelac Racing Team for the 2015. The season turned out to be a disappointment as Calero only scored points once in the last round of the season at Qatar.

Career statistics

Supersport World Championship

Races by year
(key)

References

External links
Profile on WorldSBK.com

1991 births
Living people
Spanish motorcycle racers
Supersport World Championship riders